Gunde Maersk is owned and operated by the A.P. Moller Maersk. Gunde Maersk was one of the largest container ships in the world when she was built. The Gunde Maersk was christened on 10 May 2008 at Maersk Odense Steel Shipyard in Denmark.

Hull and engine
Gunde Maersk is a fully cellular container ship with a capacity of 11,008 TEU. It was completed in May 2008 by the Odense Steel Shipyard, in yard 212. It has an overall length of 367 meters.

It is powered by a Wärtsilä 12RT-Flex96c, 2-stroke slow speed diesel engine. This engine is capable of propelling the Marchen Maersk at a top speed of 25 knots.

References 

Merchant ships of Denmark
Container ships
Ships of the Maersk Line
2008 ships
Ships built in Odense